Norberto Arrieta (born 23 February 1981) is an Argentine former footballer.

External links
 

1981 births
Living people
Argentine expatriate footballers
Argentine footballers
Deportes Melipilla footballers
Expatriate footballers in Chile
Association football forwards
Footballers from Buenos Aires